Aramingo Borough is a defunct borough that was located in Philadelphia County, Pennsylvania. The borough ceased to exist and was incorporated into the City of Philadelphia following the passage of the Act of Consolidation, 1854.

History
Aramingo Borough was created out of the Northern Liberties Township and was incorporated on April 11, 1850. Bounded on the northeast by a portion of the Bridesburg and Frankford Creek, which divided it from a portion of Oxford Township and Frankford; on the northwest the unincorporated Northern Liberties, and the Northern Liberties District were boundaries, the latter partly on the southwest; and Richmond District on the southeast and southwest.

The name is an abbreviation and alteration from the Native American name of the stream adjacent, called by the Swedes and English, Gunner’s Run. The original name was Tumanaraming, meaning "Wolf Walk." By cutting off a portion of the beginning, and omitting two letters in the center and adding an o, the word "Aramingo" was coined.

Today 
Aramingo Avenue is a major road in Port Richmond, Fishtown, and other neighborhoods in near-Northeast Philadelphia.  It is home to many stores and shopping plazas.

Resources
Chronology of the Political Subdivisions of the County of Philadelphia, 1683-1854
Information courtesy of ushistory.org
Incorporated District, Boroughs, and Townships in the County of Philadelphia, 1854 By Rudolph J. Walther - excerpted from the book at the ushistory.org website

Municipalities in Philadelphia County prior to the Act of Consolidation, 1854
Populated places established in 1850
1854 disestablishments in Pennsylvania